Asanoa ishikariensis is a bacterium from the genus Asanoa which has been isolated from soil in Japan.

References 

Micromonosporaceae
Bacteria described in 2002